Ragwort may refer to a number of plant species:

Certain members of the genus Senecio (ragworts and groundsels) including:
Senecio ampullaceus, Texas ragwort
Senecio cambrensis,  Welsh ragwort
Senecio squalidus, Oxford ragwort
Senecio viscosus, sticky ragwort
Certain members of the genus Jacobaea (a segregate of Senecio):
Jacobaea vulgaris, (tansy) ragwort, a very common wild flower in Europe, widely naturalised elsewhere
Jacobaea aquatica, water ragwort, marsh ragwort
Jacobaea erucifolia, Hoary ragwort
Certain members of the genus Packera including:
Packera obovata, Roundleaf ragwort
Packera aurea, golden ragwort
Certain member of the genus Pericallis including:
Pericallis × hybrida, common ragwort
Certain members of the genus Rugelia including:
Rugelia nudicaulis, Rugels ragwort, a wildflower found only in the Great Smoky Mountains

See also
 Ragweed (disambiguation)